Enanalloor  is a village in Ernakulam district in the Indian state of Kerala.

Demographics
 India census, Enanalloor had a population of 21465 with 10766 males and 10699 females.

References

Villages in Ernakulam district